New Concord is an unincorporated community in Calloway County, Kentucky, United States.

History
On March 1, 1833, a post office was opened at the site and named Humility, Kentucky.  Settlers from Concord, North Carolina came to the area in the late 1830s and renamed it Concord.  The post office was renamed New Concord in 1861 because there was already a Concord, Kentucky in Lewis County. It was incorporated with the name New Concord in 1868.

Fort Heiman, a Confederate gun emplacement constructed during the Battle of Fort Henry, is one and a half miles southeast of the community and is part of Fort Donelson National Battlefield. The "Boys on the Corner" hold the annual JimmyFest in New Concord every year on Memorial day weekend.

References

Unincorporated communities in Calloway County, Kentucky
Unincorporated communities in Kentucky